Hosackia rosea, synonym Lotus aboriginus, is a species of legume native to North America. It is known by the common names rosy bird's-foot trefoil and thicket trefoil. It grows in mountains and canyons, often in moist areas. It is a perennial herb lined with leaves each made up of pairs of oval leaflike leaflets 1 to 3 cm long. The inflorescence is a spray of six to 10 white or pink flowers each about 1 cm long. The flower is somewhat tubular, encased at the base in a calyx of sepals and lobed at the mouth. The fruit is a hairless elongated legume pod 3–5 cm long.

It is believed that Hosackia rosea could be a potential host plant for the caterpillars of the critically endangered lotis blue butterfly (syn. Lycaeides idas lotis, Lycaeides argyrognomon lotis, Plebejus anna lotis).

References

External links
Jepson Manual Treatment
USDA Plants Profile
Photo gallery

rosea
Flora of California
Plants described in 1896
Flora without expected TNC conservation status